Pettit's Ford is an American historic home located in Dover Township, York County, Pennsylvania.

Description
It was built in 1798, and is a two-and-one-half story, rectangular red sandstone building in the Georgian style. Also on the property are a contributing small stable / carriage house (c. 1902) and a former summer kitchen (c. 1878). The property is located at a former ford across the Conewago Creek.

It was added to the National Register of Historic Places in 1983.

See also

 1798 in architecture

References

1798 establishments in Pennsylvania
Georgian architecture in Pennsylvania
Houses completed in 1798
Houses in York County, Pennsylvania
Houses on the National Register of Historic Places in Pennsylvania
National Register of Historic Places in York County, Pennsylvania